Richard Henry Smith (born June 18, 1944) is an American football former defensive back in the National Football League for the Washington Redskins.  He played college football at Northwestern University and was selected in the ninth round of the 1966 AFL Draft by the Kansas City Chiefs.

1944 births
Living people
Sportspeople from Hamilton, Ohio
American football defensive backs
Northwestern Wildcats football players
Washington Redskins players